First Church of Christ, Scientist is located in Miami, Florida.  It is no longer a functioning Christian Science church, having been sold in 2013.  The building was designed by August C. Geiger.

Current status
First Church of Christ, Scientist, sold the building in 2013 for $6.25 million. It was resold in Nov. 2014 for  $14.25 million. In September 2015, the current owner received the city's Urban Development Review Board's approval for use of the church building "for commercial uses, topped by a large garage next door to a brand new 38-story residential tower."

First Church of Christ, Scientist, Miami, now holds meetings in its reading room at 15 West Flagler Street in Miami.

See also

 First Church of Christ, Scientist (disambiguation)
 List of former Christian Science churches, societies and buildings

References

External links

 Archiplanet listing
 Vintage post card image

Churches in Miami
Christian Science churches in Florida
1925 establishments in Florida
Churches completed in 1925